The Mokelumne Aqueduct is a  water conveyance system in central California, United States. The aqueduct is supplied by the Mokelumne River and provides water to 35 municipalities in the East Bay in the San Francisco Bay Area. The aqueduct and the associated dams, pipelines, treatment plants and hydroelectric system are owned and operated by the East Bay Municipal Utility District (EBMUD) and provide over 90 percent of the water used by the agency.

The aqueduct is the sole water supply for about 1.4 million people in the East Bay. However, this supply is expected only to be used in the driest 35% of years.

History
Although the city of San Francisco was already extending an aqueduct to the Tuolumne River, East Bay communities wanted to build an independent water system, fearing future "hegemony" of the water system by San Francisco. In 1923, the EBMUD was organized and in 1924 acquired water rights to the Mokelumne River, a major tributary in the San Joaquin River system. On November 4, 1924, residents approved $39 million in bonds to finance the project.

The first deliveries to the Bay Area were made on June 23, 1929. At the time of completion, Pardee Dam was the tallest in the world (this record was surpassed one year later by Diablo Dam in Washington State). In 1949, a second pipeline was built and in 1963 the third pipeline was constructed, bringing the aqueduct to its present capacity. In 1964, the second major dam of the project, Camanche Dam, was completed below Pardee.

In 1970, EBMUD signed a contract with the U.S. Bureau of Reclamation (USBR) for supplemental water from the Folsom South Canal, which draws water from the American River near Sacramento. The USBR supply was delayed for nearly 40 years in part due to minimum flow requirements in the American River to protect salmon and steelhead populations. The Folsom South Canal Connection (FSCC), which links the two waterways, was finally completed in 2009.

Specifications
The aqueduct begins at Pardee Reservoir, which is formed by Pardee Dam on the Mokelumne River. Camanche Reservoir, located directly below Pardee, has a storage capacity of  – twice the size of Pardee – but is not directly linked to the aqueduct. However, Camanche allows for greater diversions into the aqueduct by storing winter floodwaters spilled from Pardee. During the dry season, water is released from Camanche in order to satisfy local water-rights holders, eliminating the need to draw water from Pardee.

The aqueduct travels southwest for  through the western foothills of the Sierra Nevada and then west across the Central Valley along the Calaveras River before crossing the Sacramento–San Joaquin River Delta. Near Lodi, the aqueduct is joined by an extension of the Folsom South Canal, which supplements the Mokelumne River supply. The water is treated at the San Pablo, Sobrante and Upper San Leandro Treatment Plants before passing through the Claremont Tunnel, which emerges on the western side of the range between Berkeley and Oakland. Water not immediately put into the municipal system is stored in the reservoirs for use in times of low delivery or drought.

Most of the aqueduct consists of three separate buried steel pipelines, although there are also some aboveground segments. Aside from the main facilities, the distribution system includes  of pipes, 125 pump plants, and 168 local reservoirs/storage tanks.

Issues
The aqueduct is located in a seismically active zone and is considered vulnerable to earthquakes, especially the  stretch where it crosses the Sacramento–San Joaquin Delta, where an earthquake or storm-induced levee failure could damage the pipelines or any of three major river crossings here. A large earthquake (100 year return period or more) could put the aqueduct out of service from 18 months to three years, depending on the extent of the damage. Levee failures in 1980 and 2004 (not caused by earthquakes) on Jones Tract have threatened the aqueduct. An aqueduct joint at the crossing of the Middle River also failed in 1992, nearly causing a washout of the levee. The aqueduct was shut down in time before an actual levee breach could occur.

It would allow for more water to be provided during the dry season that would otherwise have been spilled over the dam during the winter. Due to environmental concerns, the project was shelved in 2011.

See also
Hetch Hetchy Project
Water in California

References

External links
 The Mokelumne Aqueduct – Maven's Notebook

Aqueducts in California
East Bay Municipal Utility District
Interbasin transfer
Mokelumne River
San Joaquin Valley
Infrastructure completed in 1929
1929 establishments in California
Buildings and structures in Amador County, California
Buildings and structures in Calaveras County, California
Transportation in Amador County, California
Transportation in Calaveras County, California
Transportation buildings and structures in Contra Costa County, California
Transportation buildings and structures in San Joaquin County, California
Transportation buildings and structures in Alameda County, California